Tram Nguyen (born June 22, 1986) is an American politician serving as a member of the Massachusetts House of Representatives from the 18th Essex District. She represents the towns of Andover, Boxford, North Andover, and Tewksbury. Nguyen serves as the Vice Chair of the Joint Committee on Labor & Workforce Development (first AAPI woman Vice Chair in the MA House of Representatives) and member of Joint Committee on Mental Health, Substance Use & Recovery Committee, Joint Committee on Municipalities & Regional Governments, and House Committee Human Resources & Employee Engagement (formerly Personnel & Administration). Prior to being elected as the first Vietnamese-American woman in the Massachusetts Legislature, Nguyen was an attorney at Greater Boston Legal Services providing support for survivors of domestic violence, seniors, veterans, people with disabilities, low-wage workers, and others from vulnerable communities.

Early life and education 
Nguyen was born in Vietnam and immigrated to the United States with her family as political refugees when she was 5 years old. She was raised in the Merrimack Valley and resides in Andover. Nguyen graduated from Methuen High School and enrolled at Tufts University as a first-generation college student. Before deciding to study law, Nguyen believed she wanted to study medicine and become a pediatrician. Her love for children led her to become involved with the Jumpstart program providing education to help underprivileged children develop literacy skills at a young age. However, her involvement with Jumpstart led Tram to realize that she wanted to continue to help families such as these and preferred to make change through policy, not medicine. Nguyen received a degree in Sociology and American Studies from Tufts University and then her J.D. from Northeastern University.

Career

Legal career 
Nguyen began her legal career as a fellow through Equal Justice Works, one of the most prestigious and competitive post-graduate legal fellowships in the country, and worked at Greater Boston Legal Services (GBLS), where she focused on providing legal representation to survivors of domestic violence in family and immigration law. Nguyen later became a staff attorney at GBLS and then the coordinator for the Civil Legal Assistance for Victims of Crime Project, where she represented and advocated for seniors, veterans, people with disabilities, and others from vulnerable communities who were victims of crimes. She also led the Nail Salon Initiative, an initiative to help low-wage workers fight wage theft.

State representative 
Tram Nguyen ran for State Representative of the 18th Essex District (parts of Andover, North Andover, Boxford, and Tewksbury) in Massachusetts. Nguyen ran against the incumbent Republican Rep. James J. Lyons Jr., who had been in office for 8 years prior to Nguyen's victory and was opposed to women's reproductive health and LGBTQ rights. Nguyen won with a 54% majority victory, a win that she credits to an "aggressive campaign focused on making constituents' voices heard". Her win gained back a historically Democratic seat that had been turned Republican when Lyons was elected to office. Additionally, Nguyen is the first Vietnamese-American woman to be elected to office in Massachusetts.

During her campaign, Nguyen ran on a number of substantive issues including better funding for public education, preserving the environment, prioritizing equality and inclusion for gender identity, gun violence prevention, making health care more affordable and accessible, addressing the opioid epidemic as a public health crisis, protecting seniors and veterans from a legal standpoint, investing in transportation, fighting for women's health, and improving the lives of working families.

See also
 2019–2020 Massachusetts legislature
 2021–2022 Massachusetts legislature

References

External links
 Tram Nguyen, State Representative

21st-century American politicians
21st-century American women politicians
Vietnamese emigrants to the United States
Democratic Party members of the Massachusetts House of Representatives
Tufts University alumni
American women of Vietnamese descent in politics
People from Andover, Massachusetts
Living people
1986 births
Asian-American people in Massachusetts politics